Vinay Choudhary (born 4 September 1993) is an Indian cricketer. He made his first-class debut for Punjab in the 2013–14 Ranji Trophy on 14 December 2013.

References

External links
 

1993 births
Living people
Indian cricketers
Punjab, India cricketers
Cricketers from Amritsar